You Can't See Me is the debut studio album by WWE's wrestler John Cena and his cousin, Tha Trademarc. It was released on May 10, 2005, by WWE Music Group and Columbia Records. The album features guest appearances from Esoteric and Bumpy Knuckles, who are featured on several songs throughout the album. The album production was handled by James McEwan and Todd Spadafore, with the duo serving as the executive producers on the album. The album's cover art is based on Cena's customized WWE Championship belt, while the title comes from his popular catchphrase coined on WWE television.

You Can't See Me debuted at number 15 on the Billboard 200 charts, with over 143,000 copies sold in the first week of its release. In the United Kingdom, the album peaked at number 103 on the UK Albums Chart, and has since become a certified platinum by the Recording Industry Association of America (RIAA), selling 1,346,000 units, as of October 8, 2010.

Track listing

Notes
The album went through several titles including "Underground", "Basic Thuganomics", before being released as "You Can't See Me".
The first track, "The Time is Now", has been used by Cena as his entrance music since 2005.
"The Time is Now" contains samples from "Ante Up" by M.O.P. and "The Night the Lights Went Out in Georgia" by Bobby Russell. In 2008, M.O.P. filed a lawsuit in a New York Federal Court against Sony BMG, WWE and Cena, alleging copyright infringement. M.O.P. sought the destruction of the song and asked for $150,000 in damages. They dropped the lawsuit two months later.
"Right Now" contains samples from "Now" by L.T.D.
"Just Another Day" contains samples from "As Long as You Are There" by Carolyn Franklin.
"Summer Flings" contains samples from "Dance the Kung-Fu" by Carl Douglas.
"Keep Frontin'" contains samples from "On the Mic" by Big L.
"Beantown" contains samples from "Cocaine" by Eric Clapton.
Cena originally stated on WWE.com that his previous entrance theme song, "Basic Thuganomics", would appear on the album. However, it did not make it onto the album. It was, however, released on the WWE Originals soundtrack album in January 2004.
"If it All Ended Tomorrow" was used in the ending credits of Cena's movie, The Marine.
An additional track, "The Underground", was made available on Tha Trademarc's MySpace page.
"Bad, Bad Man" was used in trailers for the fifth season of the FOX drama The Shield that focused on the Jon Kavanaugh character.

Videos
The music video for "Bad, Bad Man" spoofs 1980s culture, and focusing on the television series The A-Team, with guest stars like Gary Coleman and impersonators of Michael Jackson, Madonna, among other popular celebrities. This video is featured on the DVD for WWE's 2005 edition of Judgment Day.
The music video for "Right Now" was shot in West Newbury, Massachusetts and Hampton Beach, New Hampshire and features clips from Cena's family videos, circling in on his personal life and rise in WWE. This video was released on the DVD for WWE's 2005 edition of SummerSlam and on Cena's documentary, My Life.

Charts

See also

Music in professional wrestling

References

John Cena albums
Albums produced by Jake One
WWE albums
2005 debut albums
Columbia Records albums